Sitalçay (also, Sitalchay) is a village and municipality in the Khizi Rayon of Azerbaijan.  It has a population of 1,234.

The Sitalchay Military Airbase was located near the settlement.

References 

Populated places in Khizi District